Cita con la muerte is a Mexican telenovela produced by Televisa for Telesistema Mexicano in 1963.

Cast 
Jacqueline Andere
Ariadna Welter
Rafael Banquells
Luis Aragón
Begoña Palacios
Noé Murayama

Other versions
Pecado mortal - 1960 original version made in Mexico, starring Amparo Rivelles, Elsa Cárdenas and Osvaldo Calvo. 
La Indomable - First remake made in Venezuela in 1974, starring Marina Baura and Elio Rubens.
La venganza - First remake made in Mexico in 1977, starring Helena Rojo and Enrique Lizalde.
Rosa salvaje - 1987 remake made in Mexico, starring Verónica Castro and Guillermo Capetillo.
Marimar - Second remake made in Mexico in 1994, starring Thalía and Eduardo Capetillo.
Abrázame muy fuerte - 2000 remake made in Mexico, starring Victoria Ruffo, Aracely Arámbula, qnd Fernando Colunga.
Gata Salvaje - 2002 remake made in Venezuela, starring Marlene Favela and Mario Cimarro. 
Tormenta en el paraíso - - Third remake made in Mexico in 2007, starring  Sara Maldonado and Erick Elías.
MariMar - Third remake made in the Philippines in 2007 by GMA 7, starring Marian Rivera and Dingdong Dantes.
Alma Indomable - Second remake made in Venezuela in 2010, starring Scarlet Ortiz and Jose Angel Llamas.
Corazón indomable - Fourth remake made in Mexico in 2013, starring Ana Brenda Contreras and Daniel Arenas.
Que te perdone Dios - 2015 remake made in Mexico, starring Rebecca Jones, Zuria Vega and Mark Tacher.
MariMar - Fourth remake made in the Philippines in 2015 by GMA 7, starring Megan Young and Tom Rodriguez.

References

External links 

Mexican telenovelas
1963 telenovelas
Televisa telenovelas
1963 Mexican television series debuts
1963 Mexican television series endings
Spanish-language telenovelas